Zhou Lulu (born March 19, 1988) is a Chinese weightlifter.

Career
On November 13, 2011, she won the gold medal in the women's super heavyweight category and set an aggregate world record of 328 kg in the snatch and clean and jerk in the world weightlifting championships in Paris, France.

She won the gold medal at the 2012 Summer Olympics in the women's +75 kg category with a total of 333 kg, a new world record.

References

1988 births
Living people
Weightlifters at the 2012 Summer Olympics
Olympic weightlifters of China
World Weightlifting Championships medalists
Olympic gold medalists for China
Olympic medalists in weightlifting
Weightlifters from Shandong
Sportspeople from Yantai
Medalists at the 2012 Summer Olympics
Weightlifters at the 2014 Asian Games
Asian Games medalists in weightlifting
Chinese female weightlifters
Asian Games gold medalists for China
Medalists at the 2014 Asian Games
20th-century Chinese women
21st-century Chinese women